Abies koreana (Gusang namu), the Korean fir, is a species of fir native to the higher mountains of South Korea, including Jeju Island.

Description
The bark is smooth with resin blisters and grey-brown in colour. The leaf arrangement is spiral on the shoot, but with each leaf variably twisted at the base so they lie mostly either side of and above the shoot, with fewer below the shoot. The shoots are green-grey at first, maturing pinkish-grey, with scattered fine pubescence. The winged seeds are released when the cones disintegrate at maturity about 5–6 months after pollination.

Cultivation
The following have gained the Royal Horticultural Society's Award of Garden Merit:
 A. koreana (≥ 12 m)
 A. koreana 'Cis' (0.5–1 m)
 A. koreana 'Kohout's Ice Breaker' (0.5–1 m)
 A. koreana 'Silberlocke' (2.5–4 m)

Gallery

References

 Liu, T. S. (1971). A Monograph of the Genus Abies. National Taiwan University.

External links 
 

Koreana
Endangered flora of Asia
Endemic flora of South Korea
Trees of South Korea